Miss International 1987, the 27th Miss International pageant, was held on 13 September 1987 at the Nihon Seinen-Kan in Tokyo, Japan. Laurie Simpson Rivera from Puerto Rico won the Miss International title.

Results

Placements

Special awards

Contestants

  - Rossana Ranier
  - Vanessa Lynn Gibson
  - Kristina Sebestyen
  - Muriel Jane Georges Rens
  - Gouldin Balcázar
  - Fernanda Campos Soares
  - Debbie Ann Pearman
  - Julie Christine McDonald
  - Michelle Betancourt Vergara
  - Alexandra Eugenia Martínez Fuentes
  - Zelma Hesselmann
  - Niina Katariina Kärkkäinen
  - Joelle Annik Ramyhed
  - Dagmar Schulz
  - Peggy Thanopoulou
  - Geraldine Dydasco Gumatatao
  - Angelique Johanna Gerarda Cremers
  - Darlene Jacqueline Sikaffy Powery
  - Lam Wing-Han
  - Magnea Lovisa Magnusdóttir
  - Erika Maria de Souza
  - Barbara Ann Curran
  - Ofir Alony
  - Luisa Rigamonti
  - Denise Josephine Thompson
  - Yayoi Morita
  - Chung Wha-sun
  - Claudine Atten
  - Maria Arlette Balzan
  - Rosa Isela Fuentes Chávez
  - Philippa Lynn Beazley
  - Luciana Seman Ada
  - Hege Elisabeth Rasmussen
  - Amarilis Aurelia Sandoval
  - Rosario Elsa Leguia Nugent
  - Maria Lourdez "Lilu" Dizon Enriquez
  - Ewa Monika Nowosadko
  - Susana Paula Neto da Silva Nunes
  - Laurie Tamara Simpson Rivera
  - Marjorie Ai Ling Tan
  - Ana García Bonilla
  - Nathalie Amiet
  - Prapaphan Bamrubngthai
  - Mine Baysan
  - Paula Jean Morrinson
  - Begoña Victoria García Varas
  - Mesatewa Tuzolana

1987
1987 in Tokyo
1987 beauty pageants
Beauty pageants in Japan